Midtown High School may refer to:

 Midtown High School (Atlanta), a high school in Midtown Atlanta
 Midtown High School (comics), fictional high school in the Marvel Comics
 Midtown School of Science and Technology, the version of the high school in the Marvel Cinematic Universe